Leon Loewenton (6 January 1889 – 23 September 1963) was a Romanian and French chess player, International Judge of Chess Compositions (1956).

Biography
In 1924, in Paris Leon Loewenton played for Romania in 1st unofficial Chess Olympiad. In subsequent years, he became more widely known as chess composer. Leon Loewenton composed more than 1200 chess compositions, in his work touched on such rare topics as retrograde analysis and helpmate. In 1956 he became FIDE International Judge of Chess Compositions. In 1962, Leon Loewenton emigrated to France.

References

External links

Leon Loewenton chess games at 365Chess.com

1889 births
1963 deaths
Sportspeople from Galați
Romanian chess players
French chess players
Chess Olympiad competitors
Chess arbiters
Chess composers
20th-century chess players